Stephanus Cousius (16xx-17xx) was a botanical illustrator known for his contribution of 9 plates to Jacob Breyne's 1678 work Exoticarum aliarumque minus cognitarum plantarum centuria prima (One hundred best exotic and other lesser known plants).

References

Botanical illustrators